

List of representatives
Yoshio Hachiro, independent then Social Democratic Party, 1990, 1993
Seiichi Kaneta, independent, 1993

Election results
1993 Japanese general election
Liberal Democratic Party, 81,153 votes
Yoshio Hachiro, Social Democratic Party, 55,620 votes
Seiichi Kaneta, independent, 47,339 votes
Japanese Communist Party, 15,069 votes
1990 Japanese general election
Yoshio Hachiro, independent, 71,973 votes
Japanese Communist Party, 13,437 votes
1986 Japanese general election
Japanese Communist Party, 19,140 votes
1983 Japanese general election
Japanese Communist Party, 19,392 votes
1980 Japanese general election
Japanese Communist Party, 37,980 votes
1979 Japanese general election
Japanese Communist Party, 26,143 votes
1976 Japanese general election
Japanese Communist Party, 34,534 votes
1972 Japanese general election
Japanese Communist Party, 29,864 votes
1969 Japanese general election
Japanese Communist Party, 16,773 votes
1967 Japanese general election
Japanese Communist Party, 11,904 votes
1963 Japanese general election
Japanese Communist Party, 7,736 votes
1960 Japanese general election
Japanese Communist Party, 4,320 votes
1958 Japanese general election
Japanese Communist Party, 1,891 votes
1955 Japanese general election
Japanese Communist Party, 1,827 votes
1953 Japanese general election
1952 Japanese general election
1949 Japanese general election
1947 Japanese general election
Toshiko Karasawa, Japanese Communist Party, 6,501 votes

Politics of Hokkaido
History of Hokkaido
Districts of the House of Representatives (Japan)